Barkat Ali (born 1 June 1935) is a Pakistani boxer. He competed in the men's light heavyweight event at the 1964 Summer Olympics.

References

External links

1935 births
Living people
Pakistani male boxers
Olympic boxers of Pakistan
Boxers at the 1964 Summer Olympics
Place of birth missing (living people)
Asian Games medalists in boxing
Boxers at the 1962 Asian Games
Boxers at the 1966 Asian Games
Asian Games gold medalists for Pakistan
Asian Games bronze medalists for Pakistan
Medalists at the 1962 Asian Games
Medalists at the 1966 Asian Games
Light-heavyweight boxers
20th-century Pakistani people